La Ville dont le prince est un enfant is a 1997 made-for-television film adapted from a 1951 play by French dramatist Henry de Montherlant of the same title.

The title, literally translated, The City Where the Prince is a Child, is taken from Ecclesiastes 10:16: "Woe to thee, O land, when thy king is a child, and thy princes eat in the morning!"

The French-language film was subsequently released in North American markets on DVD in 2004 under the title, The Fire That Burns, similar to the 1977 English language translation of the play produced in 1977 under the title, The Fire that Consumes.

Summary
Philosophy student André Sevrais (played by Naël Marandin) attends a Catholic boys' school in Paris, where he becomes fast friends with his younger schoolmate, a little rebellious boy named Serge Souplier (played by Clément van den Bergh). This friendship between the two youngsters does not go unobserved by the Abbot of Pradts (played by Christophe Malavoy), who harbors a secret obsession with Souplier and uses his position of authority to try to handle the adolescent Servais, with the pretext of protecting the youngster Souplier; ultimately, however, he is undone by his own hand.

Cast
 Christophe Malavoy  – Abbot of Pradts
 Naël Marandin – André Sevrais
 Clément van den Bergh – Serge Souplier
 Michel Aumont – The Father Superior
 Pierre-Arnaud Juin – Habert
 Pierre-Alexis Hollenbeck – Linsbourg
 Michel Dussauze – Prial
 Luc Levy – Unskilled laborer
 Alain Gilbert – Cantene supervisor
 Luc Denoux – Music master

References

External links
 
 

1997 films
1990s French-language films
French television films
French LGBT-related films
French LGBT-related television shows
Films about LGBT and Christianity
Films about Catholicism
Television shows based on plays
LGBT-related drama films
1997 LGBT-related films
1997 drama films
1990s French films